The history of Nancy, France, the capital city of Lorraine, dates back to at least 800 BC with the earliest signs of human settlement in the area. Early settlers were likely attracted by easily mined iron ore and a ford in the Meurthe River. A small fortified town named Nanciacum (Nancy) was built by Gerard, Duke of Lorraine around 1050.

Prior to 19th century

 1140 –  (tower, oldest building of Nancy) built.
 1228 – Castle burns down.
 1382 –  (gate) built.
 1476 – Charles of Burgundy in power.
 1477 – 5 January: Battle of Nancy; René II, Duke of Lorraine in power again.
 1487 –  built.
 1496 – Palace of the Dukes of Lorraine construction begins.
 1633 – Town "taken by the French."
 1697 – Peace of Ryswick & Leopold, Duke of Lorraine in power.
 1731 –  built.
 1736 – Stanisław Leszczyński becomes Duke of Lorraine.
 1750 – Royal Society of Science and Humanities of Nancy and public library founded.
 1753 –  built (approximate date).
 1755 – Place Stanislas created, includes a statue of the eponymous Stanisław Leszczyński.
 1763 – Great organ of Nancy Cathedral installed.
 1766 – Nancy becomes part of France.
 1777 – Roman Catholic Diocese of Nancy established.
 1782 –  built.
 1784 – Porte Désilles (arch) built.
 1790
 31 August: Military mutiny quashed.
 Nancy becomes part of the Meurthe souveraineté.
 1792 – Statue of Louis XV removed from the Place Stanislas.
 1793 – Museum of Fine Arts of Nancy established.
 1798 – Journal de la Meurthe newspaper in publication.

19th century
 1814–1815 – Nancy occupied by allied forces during the Napoleonic Wars.
 1844 –  (school) founded.
 1848 –  established.
 1852 –  opens.
 1856 – Gare de Nancy-Ville built.
 1870 – Nancy "put to ransom by the Prussians."
 1873 –  active.
 1874 –  built.
 1884 – Orchestre symphonique et lyrique de Nancy founded.
 1886 - Population: 79,038.
 1889 – L'Est Républicain newspaper begins publication.

20th century

 1906 - Population: 98,302.
 1911
  built.
 Population: 119,949.
 1914 – September: Battle of Grand Couronné.
 1919 – Opera house rebuilt.
 1923 –  art group formed.
 1944 – September: Battle of Nancy (1944).
 1951 – Marriage of Archduke Otto von Habsburg-Lothringen, crown prince of Austria-Hungary and Duke of Lorraine, with Princess Regina of Saxe-Meiningen, at the Church of Saint-François-des-Cordeliers. The marriage was attended by his mother Empress Zita of Bourbon-Parma and high nobility.
 1964 – Musée de l'École de Nancy opens.
 1970 – Henri Poincaré University, Nancy 2 University, and School of architecture of Nancy established.
 1972 -  active.
 1978 -  literary festival begins.
 1982 – Nancy becomes part of the Lorraine region.
 1983 – André Rossinot becomes mayor.
 1988 –  begins broadcasting.
 1991
 Metz–Nancy–Lorraine Airport opens.
 Sister city relationship established with Cincinnati, USA.
 1996 –  begins.
 December 2012 – Archduke Christoph of Austria, son of Archduke Carl Christian of Austria, marries in the Basilica of Saint-Epvre

21st century

 2005 – Kinepolis Nancy (cinema) opens.
 2006 –  begins.
 2012 – Population: 105,067.
 2014 – Laurent Hénart becomes mayor.
 2016 – Nancy becomes part of the Grand Est region.

See also

 Nancy history
 
 List of mayors of Nancy (in French)
 

Other cities in the Grand Est region:
 Timeline of Metz
 Timeline of Mulhouse
 Timeline of Reims
 Timeline of Strasbourg
 Timeline of Troyes

References

This article incorporates information from the French Wikipedia and German Wikipedia.

Bibliography

in English

in French
 
  (one year in an ongoing annual)
 
 
 
 
  (Bibliography)
 
 
 
 
 
 
 

Nancy
Nancy, France
Nancy